Jean Boucher (February 20, 1926 – December 18, 2011) was a Canadian politician and notary. He was born in Laprairie, Quebec. He was elected to the House of Commons of Canada as a Member of the Liberal Party in 1953 and re-elected in 1957. He was defeated in 1958 then re-elected in 1962.

References

1926 births
2011 deaths
Members of the House of Commons of Canada from Quebec
Liberal Party of Canada MPs
Quebec notaries
People from La Prairie, Quebec